The Life Nature Library is a series of 25 hardbound books published by Time-Life between 1961 and 1965, with revisions to 1968. It has been translated from English into eight languages and sold in 90 countries.  Each volume explores an important division of the natural world and is written for educated laymen by a primary author (or authors) "and the Editors of LIFE".

The 25 volumes:
The Forest (1961; revised 1963), by Peter Farb
The Sea (1961; revised 1963), by Leonard Engel
The Desert (1961; revised 1962), by A. Starker Leopold
The Mountains (1962; revised 1967), by Lorus J. Milne and Margery Milne
Evolution (1962; revised 1964), by Ruth Moore
The Poles (1962; revised 1968), by Willy Ley
The Earth (1962; revised 1963), by Arthur Beiser
The Universe (1962; revised 1966, 1967), by David Bergamini
The Insects (1962), by Peter Farb
The Birds (1963), by Roger Tory Peterson
The Plants (1963; revised 1968), by Frits W. Went
The Mammals (1963; revised 1967), by Richard Carrington
The Fishes (1963; revised 1964), by F.D. Ommanney
The Reptiles (1963), by Archie Carr
Ecology (1963), by Peter Farb
The Land and Wildlife of North America (1964; Revised 1966), by Peter Farb
The Land and Wildlife of Africa (1964; revised 1967), by Archie Carr
The Land and Wildlife of South America (1964; revised 1968), by Marston Bates
The Land and Wildlife of Tropical Asia (1964), by S. Dillon Ripley
The Land and Wildlife of Eurasia (1964; revised 1967), by François Bourlière
The Land and Wildlife of Australia (1964; revised 1967), by David Bergamini
Early Man (1965; revised 1968), by F. Clark Howell
Animal Behavior (1965), by Niko Tinbergen
The Primates (1965), by Sarel Eimerl and Irven DeVore
A Guide to the Natural World and Index to the LIFE Nature Library (1965; revised 1967)

References

See also
March of Progress (illustration)
Life Science Library
The World We Live In

Natural history books
Time Life book series